East Blockhouse may refer to:

 East Blockhouse, a Palmerston Fort in Milford Haven
 East Blockhouse, a 16th-century fortification in Angle, Pembrokeshire